The 2010 FIBA Under-17 World Championship (German: FIBA U17-Weltmeisterschaft 2010) was the inaugural edition of the FIBA Under-17 World Championship, the biennial international men's youth basketball championship contested by the U17 national teams of the member associations of FIBA. It was hosted by Hamburg, Germany from 2 to 11 July 2010. 

The United States won their first title in the tournament against Poland.

Qualification
2009 FIBA Africa Under-16 Championship

2009 FIBA Asia Under-16 Championship

2009 FIBA Americas Under-16 Championship

2009 FIBA Europe Under-16 Championship

2009 FIBA Oceania Under-16 Championship

Host country

Squads

Groups

Preliminary round

Times given below are in CEST (UTC+2).

Group A

Group B

9th–12th playoffs

9th–12th semifinals

11th place playoff
{{Basketballbox|bg=#eee |date=10 July 2010|place=Sporthalle Hamburg, Hamburg | time=10:00
|teamA= |scoreA=87
|teamB= |scoreB=88
|Q1=27–22 |Q2=22–14 |Q3=16–27 |Q4=22–25|report=Report
|points1=Lee 22
|rebounds1=Lee 8
|assist1=Lee 8
|points2=Hamdy 21
|rebounds2=Hamdy 17
|assist2=Moustafa 3
}}

9th place playoff

Knockout round

Quarterfinals

5th–8th semifinals

Semifinals

7th place playoff

5th place playoff

Bronze medal game

Final

Final standings

AwardsAll-Tournament Team  Kevin Pangos
  Bradley Beal
  Mateusz Ponitka
  James Michael McAdoo
  Przemysław Karnowski

Statistical leadersPointsReboundsAssistsBlocksSteals'''

References

External links
Official website
 2010 FIBA U17 World Championship

 
2010
International youth basketball competitions hosted by Germany
Sports competitions in Hamburg
July 2010 sports events in Germany
2010s in Hamburg
2010–11 in German basketball